Roszel Cathcart Thomsen (August 17, 1900 – March 11, 1992) was a United States district judge of the United States District Court for the District of Maryland.

Education and career

Born in Baltimore, Maryland, Thomsen received a Bachelor of Arts degree from Johns Hopkins University in 1919 and a Bachelor of Laws from the University of Maryland School of Law in 1922. He was in private practice in Baltimore from 1922 to 1954.

Federal judicial service

On March 15, 1954, Thomsen was nominated by President Dwight D. Eisenhower to a seat on the United States District Court for the District of Maryland vacated by Judge William Calvin Chesnut. Thomsen was confirmed by the United States Senate on May 11, 1954, and received his commission on May 12, 1954. He served as Chief Judge from 1955 to 1970, and as a member of the Judicial Conference of the United States from 1958 to 1964.

In 1968 he presided over the trial of the Catonsville Nine who were charged with burning draft records. He assumed senior status on January 31, 1971. He served as a Judge of the Special Railroad Court from 1974 to 1987. Thomsen remained in senior status until his death on March 11, 1992.

References

Sources
 

1900 births
1992 deaths
Judges of the United States District Court for the District of Maryland
United States district court judges appointed by Dwight D. Eisenhower
20th-century American judges
Johns Hopkins University alumni
University of Maryland Francis King Carey School of Law alumni
Lawyers from Baltimore